The Commissioner for Province of Sind, later the Governor of Sind, was the most important government official in the province during British rule. There were 104 years of rule, out of which 89 years were under their authority. Sind was a part of the Bombay Presidency, earlier under Sir Charles Napier. However, in 1936 it became a separate province.

Governor of Sindh
 1843–1847: Sir Charles Napier became the first ever Chief Commissioner and Governor of Sind.

Commissioners for Sind

Commissioners who served British India are as follows:

1847–1850: Robert Keith Pringle
1851–1859: Henry Bartle Edward Frere
1859–1862: Jonathan Duncan Inverarity
1862–1867: Samuel Mansfield
1867–1868: William Henry Havelock
1867–1877: William Lockyer Merewether
1877–1879: Francis Dawes Melville
1879–1887: Henry Napier Bruce Erskine
1887–1889: Charles Bradley Pritchard
1889–1891: Arthur Charles Trevor
1891–1900: Henry Evan Murchison James
1900–1902: Robert Giles
1902–1903: Alexander Cumine
1903–1904: Horace Charles Mules
1904–1905: John William Pitt Muir-Mackenzie
1905–1912: Arthur Delaval Younghusband
1912–1916: William Henry Lucas
1916–1920: Henry Staveley Lawrence
1920–1925: Jean Louis Rieu
1925–1926: Partick Robert Cadell
1926–1929: Walter Frank Hudson
1929–1931: George Arthur Thomas
1931–1935: Raymond Evelyn Gibson
1935–1936: Godfrey Ferdinando Stratford Collins (officiating)

Governors of Sind

Governors who served British India are as follows:

1936–1941: Sir Lancelot Graham, 1 April 1936 to 31 March 1941
1941–1946: Sir Hugh Dow
1946–1947: Sir Robert Francis Mudie
1953–1954: Habib Ibrahim Rahimtoola

References

 Governors of Sindh
Government of Sindh
Governors of Sindh